James Sewid,  (December 31, 1913 – May 18, 1988) was a Canadian fisherman, author and former Chief councillor of the Kwakwaka'wakw at Alert Bay, British Columbia.

In 1969, he published his autobiography Guests Never Leave Hungry: The Autobiography of James Sewid, a Kwakiutl Indian, edited by James P. Spradley. The book was reprinted in 1995, several years after Sewid's death.

In 1971, he was made an Officer of the Order of Canada "for his contributions to the welfare of his people and for fostering an appreciation of their cultural heritage".

References

1913 births
1988 deaths
20th-century Canadian male writers
20th-century First Nations writers
Canadian autobiographers
Canadian male non-fiction writers
Indigenous leaders in British Columbia
Kwakwaka'wakw people
Officers of the Order of Canada
People from Alert Bay